Wilhelm Huxhorn (20 September 1955, in Pfungstadt – 15 April 2010) was a German goalkeeper and record holder. He played 221 matches for SV Darmstadt 98.

He died after years of struggle of leukemia.

References

External links
 
 

1955 births
2010 deaths
German footballers
SV Darmstadt 98 players
2. Bundesliga players
Association football goalkeepers
Deaths from cancer in Germany